The 1K17 Szhatie (Russian: 1К17 Сжатие — "Compression") is a self-propelled laser vehicle of Soviet origin. The platform uses a Msta-S chassis with a battery of laser projectors mounted in the turret. It was developed by the Soviet Union in order to disable the optical-electronic equipment of enemy missiles, ground and aerial vehicles.

History
The 1K17 Szhatie was developed in the 1970s and 1980s. Although the Soviet Union attempted to keep the plans secret, the Pentagon managed to obtain drawings from defectors. Western intelligence services code named it the Stiletto. With the collapse of the Soviet Union, the development of the Szhatie was abandoned, as the development and manufacturing of the laser projection system had become too expensive and unnecessary. Two of these "tanks" were tested, with one being scrapped and the other being displayed in the Army Technology Museum near Moscow, but without its laser projector.

Design
The "tank" used an intense laser beam to disable the optical-electronic equipment of the enemy vehicles. This was created by focusing light through 30 kg of artificial rubies, which made the whole system very expensive to produce. The optics that produced the laser were placed at the end of a silver coated spiral which helped amplify the beam and increase convergence. The energy to power the laser was provided by a generator and an auxiliary battery system. The lenses themselves were able to operate in different environments by moving metal caps closer to protect the lens. It was also equipped with a 12.7mm NSV machine gun to defend itself against attacks by infantry and air.

A similar laser system was also developed around the same time named "Sangvin", which was based on the ZSU-23-4 self-propelled anti-aircraft gun.

Trivia
This vehicle has sparked a folk tale in Romania claiming that in 1968 the Romanian President Nicolae Ceaușescu used "laser weapons" against the Russian tanks. It claims that after the Warsaw Pact invasion of Czechoslovakia Ceaușescu, after he received a telegram from the Foreign Ministry of Great Britain stating that the country was a target for a large-scale attack, believed that Russia would invade Romania next, especially after squashing the Prague spring, so he ordered the deployment of Romanian troops to reinforce the border with the USSR and equipped them with the so called "laser weapons". 

There are no witnesses or evidence to support that this encounter was real or that such weapon ever existed.

References

External links

"Star Wars" Laser Machines of the Soviet Past
Secret Laser Devices of the Soviet Union

Cold War tanks of the Soviet Union
Military lasers
Abandoned military projects of the Soviet Union
History of the tank